Qhispi Rumiyuq (Quechua qhispi rumi, obsidian (qhispi, q'ispi, qispi glass, transparent, rumi stone, literally glass stone or transparent stone), -yuq a suffix to indicate ownership, "the one with obsidian", Hispanicized spelling Quesperumiyoc) is a mountain in the Cusco Region in Peru, about  high. It is situated in the Paucartambo Province, Challabamba District, northwest of Paucartambo.

References 

Mountains of Peru
Mountains of Cusco Region